Jarit Johnson (born January 16, 1979) is an American competitive racing driver. He is the brother of NASCAR champion Jimmie Johnson, and a former NASCAR competitor; he currently drives a Pro 2 Trophy Truck in the TORC: The Off Road Championship series.

Racing career

After making a name for himself in off-road competition, Johnson made his debut in NASCAR competition in 2005, competing in two events in the Craftsman Truck Series in the No. 08 for Green Light Racing with a best finish of 25th. Johnson made his debut in the Nationwide Series in 2008, driving the No. 22 Dodge for Fitz Motorsports. In 2009, he attempted to qualify for four Nationwide events for SK Motorsports in their No. 07 and No. 44 cars. Johnson also started the 2009 season competing part-time in the Camping World East Series in the No. 23 for Trail Motorsports (the successor team to Fitz), but the team folded due to lack of sponsorship after just one race, and as a result, Johnson formed his own team (initially running Trail's No. 23 before switching to the No. 74) which he would drive for in his races that season instead as well as the season-opener in 2010 at Greenville-Pickens Speedway. His final start in NASCAR came in the 2010 Nationwide race at Nashville in the No. 87 for NEMCO Motorsports, where he finished 31st.

After being unable to find a NASCAR ride in 2011, Johnson returned to off-road racing in 2012, where he has remained ever since. Competing in the Traxxas TORC Series Pro-2 class in 2013, he was named the series' Rookie of the Year. The series was renamed as TORC: The Off-Road Championship. He continued in the Pro 2 class and finished sixth in the 2014 points. Johnson raced in selected TORC Pro 2 events in 2015 finishing sixth in the points.

Personal life
Johnson was born in El Cajon, California, on January 16, 1979, to Catherine and Gary Johnson. He has two brothers. Jimmie, a seven-time NASCAR Cup Series champion, is the oldest of the three brothers. Jessie, the youngest, also competes in professional off-road races (as of 2015).

Motorsports career results

NASCAR
(key) (Bold – Pole position awarded by qualifying time. Italics – Pole position earned by points standings or practice time. * – Most laps led.)

Nationwide Series

Craftsman Truck Series

K&N Pro Series East

Camping World West Series

ARCA Re/Max Series
(key) (Bold – Pole position awarded by qualifying time. Italics – Pole position earned by points standings or practice time. * – Most laps led.)

References

External links

 
 

Living people
1979 births
Sportspeople from El Cajon, California
Racing drivers from California
NASCAR drivers
Off-road racing drivers
ARCA Menards Series drivers